David Murray Quintet (subtitled with Ray Anderson & Anthony Davis) is an album by David Murray, recorded in 1994 and released on the Japanese DIW label in 1996. It features performances by Murray, trombonist Ray Anderson, pianist Anthony Davis, bassist Kenny Davis and drummer Tommy Campbell.

Reception
The AllMusic review by Chris Kelsey stated: "This is a first-rate album by as heavy an ad hoc group as you'll find anywhere."

Track listing
 "Stompin' at the Savoy" (Sampson, Goodman, Webb) - 7:57 
 "Disguise The Limit" (Anderson) - 6:17 
 "Jaywalking" (Kenny Davis) - 5:42 
 "Andrew" (Anthony Davis) - 10:24 
 "Kiano" (Anthony Davis) - 11:55 
 "Funkalific" (Anderson) - 8:53

Personnel
David Murray - tenor saxophone, bass clarinet
Ray Anderson - trombone
Anthony Davis - piano
Kenny Davis -  bass
Tommy Campbell - drums

References 

1996 albums
David Murray (saxophonist) albums
DIW Records albums